Frank Seiler Butterworth Sr. (September 21, 1870 – August 21, 1950) was an American football player and coach.  Butterworth attended Yale University, where he was a fullback on Yale's football teams and a member of the Skull and Bones society.  He was famously enucleated by Bert Waters during "The Bloodbath in Hampden Park".  He was selected as an All-American in 1893 and 1894.  Butterworth was also a track star and boxer at Yale.  After his college career was over, Butterworth coached football at the University of California, Berkeley (1895–1896) and Yale (1897–1898).  The 1897 Yale football team coached by Butterworth went undefeated with two ties, against Army and Harvard.

Butterworth worked for the bankers Bertron & Storrs, was a senior partner with real estate brokers F. S. Butterworth & Company, and was president of the New Haven Hotel Company.  He served as a Connecticut State Senator from 1907 to 1909 and was a Second Lieutenant in the Chemical Warfare Service during World War I.  Butterworth died in his sleep at age 79 in Connecticut.

Head coaching record

References

External links

1870 births
1950 deaths
19th-century players of American football
American male boxers
California Golden Bears football coaches
Yale Bulldogs football coaches
Yale Bulldogs football players
Yale Bulldogs men's track and field athletes
Yale Bulldogs boxers
All-American college football players
Connecticut state senators
United States Army personnel of World War I
United States Army officers
People from Warren County, Ohio
Coaches of American football from Ohio
Players of American football from Ohio